The Perfect Flaw is a 1934 British crime film directed by H. Manning Haynes and starring Naomi Waters, Ralph Truman and William Hartnell. The screenplay concerns a clerk who is planning to murder a stockbroker but is foiled in the attempt.

Cast
 Naomi Waters ...  Phyllis Kearns
 D. A. Clarke-Smith ...  Louis Mddox
 Ralph Truman ...  Richard Drexel
 Wally Patch ...  Bert
 Charles Carson ...  Henry Kearns
 Romilly Lunge ...  Jack Robbins
 William Hartnell ...  Vickers
 Hal Walters ...  Jennings

References

External links

1934 films
1934 crime films
Films directed by H. Manning Haynes
British black-and-white films
British crime films
1930s English-language films
1930s British films